English Literary Renaissance is a peer-reviewed academic journal dedicated to the study of English literature from 1485 to 1665. Besides scholarly articles, it publishes rare texts and manuscripts from the period. It was established in 1971 and is edited by Joseph Black, Mary Thomas Crane, Jane Hwang Degenhardt, and Adam Zucker. The journal is published by the University of Chicago Press and covers Shakespeare, Donne, Edmund Spenser, and John Milton, among other Tudor and early Stuart authors.

External links 
 

Triannual journals
Publications established in 1971
Wiley-Blackwell academic journals
Literary magazines published in the United Kingdom
English-language journals